Iferanserin (INN; VEN-309) is a drug which acts as a selective 5-HT2A receptor antagonist. It is under development as an intra-rectal formulation for the treatment of hemorrhoid disease, and as of February 2012, is in phase IIb clinical trials.

References 

5-HT2A antagonists
Carboxamides
Piperidines